Benjamin Logan High School is a public high school in Logan County, Ohio.  It is the only high school in the Benjamin Logan Local Schools district.

Background
Benjamin Logan High School is a secondary school located at 55° 45′ 0″ N 37° 37′ 0″ E. The first high school building was the former Zanesfield building and in 1990 it was moved to its current location.

Teachers from Ben Logan host Japanese teachers as a cultural exchange.

Athletics
The school offers 13 varsity sports. It holds Ohio state records for:

Football: longest run (99 yards, Scott Rose)
Wrestling: third fastest pin (0:05, Cole Carpenter 275 lb (125 kg))
Baseball: second most home runs in a game (Eric Stucke, 4); second most hits-by-pitches in a game (Landon Small, 3), and fifth for hits-by-pitches in a season (Landon Small, 13)
Volleyball: fourth kill in a match (Nicole Fawcett, 38) and second kills in a season (Nicole Fawcett, 539)
Benjamin Logan also sponsors soccer, track and field, cross country, golf, bowling, and basketball teams.

Notes and references

High schools in Logan County, Ohio
Public high schools in Ohio
1970 establishments in Ohio